is a member of the Social Democratic Party of Japan who served as the vice governor of Okinawa from 1993 to 1998. She was the first woman from Okinawa to be elected to the National Diet, a position she was elected to in June 2000. She was also the mayor of Okinawa. She is a supporter of the women's movement and is opposed to US military bases in Okinawa. This opposition is due to the bases' disturbing the residents of Okinawa and because of crimes committed by some of those stationed there.

References

Living people
20th-century Japanese women politicians
20th-century Japanese politicians
Social Democratic Party (Japan) politicians
Members of the Diet of Japan
Governors of Okinawa Prefecture
Year of birth missing (living people)
21st-century Japanese women politicians
21st-century Japanese politicians